Possenti is an Italian surname. Notable people with the surname include:

Benedetto Possenti (17th century), Italian Baroque painter
Giovanni Pietro Possenti (1618–1659), Italian Baroque painter
Justin Possenti  (born 1973), American actor director
Marcello Possenti (born 1992), Italian footballer

Italian-language surnames